Sergei Sergeevich Chetverikov (6 May 1880 – 2 July 1959) was a Russian biologist and one of the early contributors to the development of the field of genetics. His research showed how early genetic theories applied to natural populations, and has therefore contributed towards the modern synthesis of evolutionary theory. 

Between the two World Wars, Soviet biological research managed to connect genetics with field research on natural populations. Chetverikov lead a team at the Nikolai Koltsov Institute of Experimental Biology in Moscow, and in 1926 produced what should have been one of the landmark papers of the modern synthesis. However, published only in Russian, it was largely ignored in the English-speaking world (though J.B.S. Haldane possessed a translation).

Chetverikov influenced several Russian geneticists who later came to work in the West, such as Theodosius Dobzhansky and Nikolay Timofeev-Ressovsky, both of whom continued to work in a similar style. The significance of Chetverikov's work came to light much later, by which time the evolutionary synthesis was virtually complete.

He was arrested by OGPU in 1929 and sent to exile to Yekaterinburg for five years. He later moved to Nizhny Novgorod and organized the Department of Genetics at Gorky University. He was dismissed from his post at the behest of Lysenko in 1948.

References

External links
 The Synthesis Of S. S. Chetverikov
 Article about him (Russian)
 His biography (Russian)

Population geneticists
Russian geneticists
Russian entomologists
1880 births
1959 deaths
Modern synthesis (20th century)
Soviet entomologists
Soviet geneticists